San Miguel de Bernuy is a municipality located in the province of Segovia, Castile and León, Spain. As of 2016, the municipality has a population of 148.

References

Municipalities in the Province of Segovia